Roald Dahl short stories bibliography is a comprehensive annotated list of short stories written by Roald Dahl.

Short stories

Collections

Omnibus editions

References

External links

Dahl, Roald short stories

Bibliographies of British writers
Dahl, Roald short stories
Children's literature bibliographies